Yuniesky Quesada Pérez (born July 31, 1984) is a Cuban-American chess player. He was awarded the title of Grandmaster by FIDE in 2005. Quesada is the fourth Cuban to surpass the 2600 Elo rating mark, which he did on the FIDE list of July 2010. He won the Cuban Chess Championship in 2008 and 2011.

In April 2015, Quesada won the Philadelphia Open edging out Ioan-Cristian Chirila on tiebreak score.

Family
His younger brother, Yasser Quesada Pérez, is also a Grandmaster.

References

External links
Yuniesky Quesada Perez chess games at 365Chess.com

1984 births
Living people
People from Villa Clara Province
Cuban chess players
American chess players
Chess grandmasters
Cuban emigrants to the United States